Snooker world rankings 2009/2010: The professional world rankings for all the professional snooker players in the 2008–09 season who qualified for the 2009–10 season are listed below. The points listed here take into account the snooker world ranking points 2007/2008 and snooker world ranking points 2008/2009.

Notes

Former world number 1 Mark Williams returns to the top 16, but no new players attain this ranking.
The player to drop out the top 16 is Graeme Dott (a member of the top 16 for 7 consecutive seasons).
Players to reach career high rankings within the top 16 are: Ali Carter No.5, Ryan Day No.6, Marco Fu No.8 and Mark Allen No.11.
Three new players reach the top 32: Ricky Walden, Liang Wenbo and Judd Trump. Two players return to the top 32: Michael Holt at No.24 and Gerard Greene at No.32. Five players drop out: Anthony Hamilton, Dominic Dale, Ian McCulloch, Michael Judge and Ken Doherty to 33rd, 34th, 35th, 36th and 44th place respectively.

References

2009
Rankings 2010
Rankings 2009